The Kirtland Egyptian papers (KEP) are a collection of documents related to the Book of Abraham created in Kirtland between July and November 1835, and Nauvoo between March through May 1842. Because some documents were created in Nauvoo, the collection is sometimes referred to as the Book of Abraham and Related Manuscripts and Joseph Smith Egyptian Papers.

The papers include an "Egyptian alphabet" written in the hand of Joseph Smith, other Egyptian language related materials and early manuscript versions of the Book of Abraham in the handwriting of Oliver Cowdery, W. W. Phelps, Warren Parish, Willard Richards, and Frederick G. Williams.

The papers have been a source of controversy, because the translations and interpretations within are not considered accurate by Egyptologists, and have thus stoked questions of whether the Book of Abraham is a literal translation of the Joseph Smith Papyri. Some apologists of the Church of Jesus Christ of Latter-day Saints (LDS Church) have postulated that many of the papers may have been produced by Smith's scribes without his involvement, and that they may have been intended as a speculative or naturalistic effort rather than a product of revelation.

Content
The Kirtland Egyptian papers are housed in the Church History Library of the LDS Church. They comprise over a dozen other documents produced ca. 1835 and 1842 in Kirtland, Ohio, and Nauvoo, Illinois. All dates for production are estimates. Due to controversy about the order of production, there is no generally accepted manuscript numbering scheme.  The manuscript numbers (MS #) reported below refer to the folder numbers under which the manuscripts are catalogued in the Church archives. These folder numbers were assigned by Hugh Nibley ca. 1971.[1]. The order given below mirrors the authoritative Joseph Smith Papers project.

Notebooks of Copied Egyptian Characters

When Michael Chandler arrived in Kirtland in 1835 with the Egyptian Papyri, he allowed Oliver Cowdery to copy "four or five different sentences" from the papyri.  A translation of the lines by Joseph Smith were given to Michael Chandler to his satisfaction.  Given that the "Valuable Discovery" notebook was written in Oliver Cowdery's hand, signed by Joseph Smith, with a translation of some of the characters, it is postulated that it is the same notebook.

  Most of the copied Egyptian characters in either notebook were untranslated by Smith or his associates.

Some of the characters are translated to read "Katumin, Princess, daughter of On-i-tas King of Egypt, who began to reign in the year of the world 2962.  Katumin was born in the 30th year of the reign of her father and died when she was 28 years old which was in the year 3020."  The Egyptian Hieratic characters have been translated by modern Egyptologists to read "Recitation by the Osiris".

The name Onitas appears in other Kirtland Egyptian manuscripts, and Joseph Smith's mother would later state that the mummies were "King Onitus and his royal household."

Copies of Egyptian Characters

Egyptian Alphabet Documents

The three Egyptian Alphabet documents created by Joseph Smith and his associates are an attempt to systematize the Egyptian language.  Much like a dictionary, there are columns with the character, pronunciation and the definition of the character.  The documents are incomplete, with many of the characters lacking definitions.

Some of the characters do not come from the Papyri, but from what Joseph Smith told William W. Phelps were Adamic language characters.

Grammar and Alphabet of the Egyptian Language

Authorship controversy

Egyptologist I. E. S. Edwards stated that the Egyptian Alphabet and Grammar was "largely a piece of imagination and lacking in any kind of scientific value."  Hugh Nibley commented that the Grammar was "of no practical value whatever."

In 1968, Jay Todd suggested that the Grammar may have been reverse-engineered from an inspired Book of Abraham translation.  In 1971, Hugh Nibley expanded on Todd's argument, explaining that the Alphabet and Grammar materials were largely an uninspired production of Joseph Smith's scribes, who had turned against him and were working independently of him at the time.  This view is also accepted by John Gee.  Samuel M. Brown has argued for a slightly more nuanced version of this view, attributing to W. W. Phelps a "major" role in authoring the Alphabet and Grammar, while at the same time conceding that the project was carried on under Smith's direction.  Brown asserts that it is "unlikely, though not impossible, that the Grammar was actively used in producing the Book of Abraham."

In 1970, Richard P. Howard proposed the opposite view: that the Alphabet and Grammar was the modus operandi of the Book of Abraham's translation.  Edward H. Ashment has also adopted this view, arguing against Nibley that the scribes of the KEP were all loyal to and in good standing with Joseph Smith at the time the manuscripts were produced.  More recently, Christopher C. Smith has argued at some length that Joseph Smith was the primary author of the Alphabet and Grammar documents, and that those documents served as the source or modus operandi for the translation of at least the first three verses of the Book of Abraham.  According to Smith, "This undoubtedly accounts for the choppiness and redundancy of these three verses, which stylistically are very different from the remainder of the Book of Abraham.  Verse 3, for example, reads as though it has been cobbled together from a series of dictionary entries."

Book of Abraham Manuscripts circa July-circa November 1835

Publication
The LDS Church has been accused of suppressing the Kirtland Egyptian Papers because they were considered potentially damaging to the credibility of Joseph Smith, Jr. as a prophet.  The Papers have been in the Church Historian and Recorder's vault in Salt Lake City since 1855, and there are indications that the Church Historians have been aware of the documents' whereabouts since 1908.  Their existence was denied until 1935, when James R. Clark and Sidney B. Sperry were informed that they were in the vault.  Even then, Clark and Sperry were not permitted to inform the public about the discovery until some time thereafter.  When the documents' existence was finally revealed, Clark stated that he did not believe the Alphabet and Grammar should be submitted to scholars. He preferred to "depend on our testimonies of the gospel."

Jerald and Sandra Tanner, critics of the Church, obtained an unauthorized copy of a microfilm strip containing images of the documents in 1966, and published them as Joseph Smith's Egyptian Alphabet & Grammar.  This publication was criticized in a BYU Studies article by Hugh Nibley in 1971 because it did not contain all of the manuscripts, and included no critical apparatus to aid readers in distinguishing one manuscript from another.  Nibley's article included images of ten of the manuscript pages.  The Tanner publication was revised and updated by H. Michael Marquardt in 1981.  Marquardt added a critical apparatus and some interpretive material. A new critical edition of the Book of Abraham manuscripts by Brian M. Hauglid appeared in 2011, with a second volume planned to publish the remainder of the KEP.

On October 29, 2018, the Joseph Smith Papers project released all existing documents relating to the creation of the Book of Abraham, including high resolution images of all the Egyptian Papyri, KEPs, and Nauvoo papers.

See also
Reformed Egyptian
Book of Abraham
Criticism of the Book of Abraham
Joseph Smith Hypocephalus
The Joseph Smith Papers
Joseph Smith Papyri
Kolob

Notes

External links

The Egyptian Alphabet from The Joseph Smith Papers (accessed December 17, 2016)
Book of Abraham manuscript materials from The Joseph Smith Papers (accessed December 17, 2016)

Pearl of Great Price (Mormonism)
Criticism of Mormonism
Works by Joseph Smith
Latter Day Saint movement in Ohio
Kirtland, Ohio
Book of Abraham